Love Island is a studio album by Brazilian keyboardist Eumir Deodato, released in 1978 on Warner Bros. Records. The album reached No. 9 on the Billboard Jazz Albums chart, but just No. 100 on the Canadian charts. "Whistle Bump" shared No. 1 on the Canadian 'Dance/Urban' charts, June 17, 1978.

Track listing
Adapted from album's text.

References

External links
 

1978 albums
Eumir Deodato albums
Albums produced by Eumir Deodato
Albums produced by Tommy LiPuma
Albums recorded at Capitol Studios
Warner Records albums